This is a list of roads designated A2. Roads entries are sorted alphabetically by country.

 A2 motorway (Albania), a road connecting Vlore with Fier
 A002 road (Argentina), a road connecting Avenida General Paz and Ministro Pistarini International Airport
 A2 road (Australia) may refer to :
 A route consisting of parts of Windsor Road and Old Windsor Road in Sydney.
The shield allocations of either the Barkly Highway, Landsborough Highway, or Warrego Highway, Queensland
 The Bass Highway, a highway connecting the Midland Highway, Launceston, Tasmania and the Arthur River Road
 A2 motorway (Austria), a road connecting Vienna and the A23 to Arnoldstein and the Italian Autostrada A23
 A2 motorway (Belgium), a road connecting Leuven and the Dutch border near Sittard
 A2 highway (Botswana), a road connecting Francistown and Kasane
 A2 motorway (Bulgaria), a road under construction connecting Sofia and Varna
 A2 motorway (Croatia), a road connecting Zagreb and Slovenia
 A2 motorway (Cuba), a ring road serving Havana
 A2 motorway (Cyprus), a road connecting Nicosia and Larnaca
 A2 motorway (France), a road connecting Combles and the border with Belgium
 A2 motorway (Germany), a road connecting the Ruhr Area and Berlin
A2 motorway (Greece), longest motorway in Greece
 A2 motorway (Italy), a road connecting Fisciano with Villa San Giovanni
 A2 motorway (Italy): Former name of the highway connecting Rome and Naples. Since 1988, after the construction of a connection to the A1 (Milan-Rome) bypassing Rome's ring road, the code A1 refers to the whole motorway between Milan and Naples.
 A2 road (Jamaica), a road connecting Spanish Town and Savanna-la-Mar
 A2 road (Jersey), a dual carriage way in Jersey, Channel Islands
 A2 highway (Kazakhstan), a road in Kazakhstan
 A2 road (Kenya), a road connecting Nairobi and Moyale 
 A2 road (Latvia), a road connecting Riga and the Estonian border
 A2 highway (Lithuania), a road connecting Vilnius and Panevėžys
 A2 road (Malaysia) may refer to :
 A2 road (Perak), a road connecting Taiping and Kamunting
 A2 road (Sabah), a road connecting Lawas, Sarawak and Kota Kinabalu
 A2 motorway (Morocco), a road connecting Rabat and Fes
 A2 motorway (Netherlands), a road connecting Amsterdam and the Belgian border near Maastricht
 A2 highway (Nigeria), a road connecting Port Harcourt and Kano to the Niger Republic
 A2 road (People's Republic of China) may refer to :
 A2 expressway (Shanghai), the former name of the S2 expressway in Shanghai
 A2 autostrada (Poland), a road connecting the border with Germany and the border with Belarus, running through Warsaw
 A2 motorway (Portugal), a road connecting Lisbon and the Algarve
 A2 motorway (Romania), a road connecting Bucharest and Constanţa
 A2 motorway (Serbia), a road connecting Belgrade and Čačak
 A2 motorway (Slovenia), a road connecting the Austrian border and Obrežje at the Croatian border
 A2 road (Spain) may refer to :
 A-2 motorway (Spain), a road connecting Madrid and Barcelona
 A2 motorway (Extremadura), a road connecting Miajadas and Don Benito-Villanueva de la Serena
 A 2 road (Sri Lanka), a road connecting Colombo and Wellawaya
 A2 motorway (Switzerland), a road connecting Basel and Chiasso
 A2 highway (Thailand), AH2 road of the Asian Highway Network
 A2 road (United Kingdom) may refer to :
 A2 road (England), a road connecting London and Dover
 A2 road (Isle of Man), a road connecting Douglas and Ramsey
 A2 road (Northern Ireland), a road connecting Newry, County Down and Muff, County Donegal
 A2 road (United States of America) may refer to :
 Interstate A-2, a road in Alaska
 County Route A2 (California), a road connecting California State Route 299 and California State Route 139
 A-2 (Michigan county highway), a road running along the shoreline of Lake Michigan in the Lower Peninsula of Michigan
 A2 road (Zimbabwe), a road connecting Harare and Kaombe, Mozambique

See also
 List of highways numbered 2